Seth MacFarlane's Cavalcade of Cartoon Comedy is an  adult animated web series created by Seth MacFarlane.

Background
This series is a compilation of animated sketches released on YouTube. The series, which aired several episodes a month, was originally sponsored by Burger King, who sponsored the first 10 shorts, with videos appearing on their official channel. The series was then sponsored by Priceline.com, and finally, Nike. There are a total of 50 episodes. It has seen a successful launch on MacFarlane's YouTube channel, SethComedy, becoming the most watched YouTube channel of the week, generating three million video views within two days of the first episode's release. MacFarlane later expressed disappointment with the quality of the series, believing he had been unable to give the show the commitment it needed at the time.

Home media
The first season, with additional content, was released on DVD, Blu-ray Disc and UMD Video on May 12, 2009, and was released on DVD in the UK on January 25, 2010. In addition to the 23 episodes officially released online, 27 episodes were exclusively included on the DVD and Blu-ray release. The release uncensored the first eleven episodes which were censored online.

List of episodes

References

External links

2008 web series debuts
2009 web series endings
2000s American adult animated television series
2000s American sketch comedy television series
American adult animated comedy television series
American adult animated web series
American comedy web series
Television series by Fox Television Animation
Works by Seth MacFarlane
Television series by Fuzzy Door Productions